Hubert Newcombe Alyea (October 10, 1903 – October 19, 1996) was an American professor of chemistry at Princeton University. His explosive chemistry demonstrations earned him the nickname "Dr. Boom". He was famous around the world for his "zany, eccentric" public lectures on science, which "were as much performance as professorship". Alyea served as inspiration for the title character in the 1961 film The Absent-Minded Professor.

In 1984, Alyea received the Joseph Priestley award.

Career at Princeton
The New York Times described his Princeton lectures as follows:

Public lectures
According to Time magazine, he "lectured with an animated, dynamic style that drew enthusiastic audiences of all ages". 

Life magazine reported "Grimacing with fiendish delight... he sets off explosions, shoots water pistols and sprays his audience with carbon dioxide in the course of 32 harrowing experiments dramatizing complicated theory". A shortened version of the lecture was featured on a 1955 NBC TV series Princeton '55: An Exploration into Education through Television; it won an Emmy.

"Lucky Accidents, Great Discoveries, and the Prepared Mind" was a lecture he gave frequently about the nature of scientific discovery.

Retirement
After his retirement, Alyea continued to deliver lectures at Princeton reunions. His memoir, My Life as a Chemist, was published in 1991.

Alyea died in his sleep at his home in Hightstown, New Jersey, on October 22, 1996, at the age of 93.

Awards
New Jersey Science Teachers Award (1954)
New Jersey Education Citation (1957)
Chemical Manufacturers Association Award (1964)
Award from the New Jersey Chapter of the American Institute of Chemists (1966)
Award in Chemical Education from the American Chemical Society (1970)
James Flack Norris Award from the Northeast Section of the American Chemical Society (1970)
Robert H. Carleton Award from the National Science Teachers Association (1991)
Joseph Priestley Award (1984)

References

External links

1903 births
1996 deaths
20th-century American chemists
People from Clifton, New Jersey
People from Hightstown, New Jersey
Princeton University faculty
Princeton University alumni
University of Minnesota fellows